Max Dole Gilfillan (March 22, 1894 – May 24, 1954) was an American football coach and college athletics administrator.  He served as the head football coach at Daniel Baker College in Brownwood, Texas from 1921 to 1923.  Gilfillan played college football at Texas A&M University from 1914 to 1916.

Gilfillan served in the United States Marine Corps in World War I and World War II, reaching the rank of lieutenant colonel.  A native of St. Johnsbury, Vermont, he was wounded in action during World War I.  Gilfillan worked in the brick business and was a resident of Tyler, Texas for 28 years, until his death there on May 24, 1954.

Head coaching record

References

External links
 

1894 births
1959 deaths
American construction businesspeople
American football halfbacks
Baseball pitchers
Daniel Baker Hillbillies athletic directors
Daniel Baker Hillbillies football coaches
Texas A&M Aggies baseball players
Texas A&M Aggies football players
United States Marine Corps personnel of World War I
United States Marine Corps personnel of World War II
United States Marine Corps officers
People from St. Johnsbury, Vermont
Players of American football from Vermont
Baseball players from Vermont